S.V. Racing Club Curaçao is a Curaçaoan tennis club located in Willemstad. The club is a multi purpose sports club with its association football team having won the Curaçao League First Division in the 1936–37 season.

Honours
Official trophies (recognized by CONCACAF and FIFA)

National
Curaçao League First Division (1):
1936–37

References

Football clubs in Curaçao
Football clubs in the Netherlands Antilles
Association football clubs established in 1926
1926 establishments in Curaçao